The 2019 Prime Minister Cup was the third edition of Prime Minister One Day Cup, which featured 10 teams.

Group stage

Group A

Group B 

 The top two teams from each group qualified for the playoffs.

Playoffs

Semi-finals

Final

References

External links
 Series home at ESPN Cricinfo

Prime Minister Cup
Prime Minister Cup